Trevor Fetter is an American businessman, the lead independent director of The Hartford Financial Services Group, and the former president, CEO, and chairman of Tenet Healthcare. He is a senior lecturer in the General Management unit of Harvard Business School (HBS), teaching Leadership and Corporate Accountability in its MBA program; his alma mater, where he is also a founding member of the HBS Healthcare Initiative Advisory Board, and a former member of the Board of Dean's Advisors. He has appeared several times on the “100 Most Influential People in Healthcare" list compiled by Modern Healthcare.

Early life, education
Fetter was born and raised in La Jolla, California, where he graduated from La Jolla High School. He received his bachelor's degree in economics from Stanford University, in 1982, then earned an M.B.A from Harvard Business School, in 1986.

Career

Fetter began his career with Merrill Lynch Capital Markets, providing corporate finance and advisory services for the entertainment and health care industries. In 1988, he joined Metro-Goldwyn-Mayer, Inc., as executive vice-president, and was later promoted to chief financial officer.

Fetter served as chairman, president and CEO of Tenet Healthcare between 2003 and 2017, where he oversaw corporate functions, including information systems, finance, law, human resources, communications and administration. In February 2017, he left Tenet to serve as the founding chairman and CEO of Broadlane, Inc. In November 2002, he returned to Tenet to serve as company president, and was named acting CEO in May 2003.

Fetter now serves as the lead independent director of The Hartford Financial Services Group, and is a senior lecturer of Business Administration at Harvard Business School, where he teaches leadership and corporate accountability. He has also been named, several times, on Modern Healthcare'''s “100 Most Influential People in Healthcare" list, ranking No. 13 in 2014.

 Professional affiliations 

Fetter was chairman of the Federation of American Hospitals, from March 2009 to March 2010, during the passage of The Affordable Care Act; chaired the board of directors of Tenet Healthcare, from May 7, 2015, to October 23, 2017; and is on the board of The Hartford. He is also a past member of the Business Roundtable.

Other affiliations include:

 TowerBrook Capital Partners – senior advisory board member
 Stanford University School of Medicine Board of Fellows
 Trimedx, Inc. – independent director
 Catalina Island Conservancy – benefactor member
 United States of Care – Founder's Council member
 Smithsonian Institution National Board – member

Personal life
He is married to (Susan) Melissa Foster, and was wed in Episcopal Church by the same Bishop who had performed his parents' marriage ceremony 26 years earlier.

In 2017, Trevor and Melissa Fetter received the Humanitarian Award from the Anti-Defamation League.

Melissa Fetter was appointed chair of the board of the Dallas Museum of Art in December 2018.

 See also 
Tenet Healthcare

References

 External links 

 Video, "Strong Effect from Healthcare Reform", CNBC, May 6, 2014. 
 "The Rebirth of Tenet Healthcare" by Bradford Pearson March 6, 2013. Retrieved 2019-01-04.
 "CEO to know: Trevor Fetter of Tenet Healthcare" Becker's Hospital Review'', ASC COMMUNICATIONS, Dec 31, 2014. Retrieved 2019-01-04.
 "Trevor Fetter - President and chief executive officer, Tenet Healthcare Corporation" Reference for Business. Retrieved 2019-01-04.
 "Key Trends Shaping Healthcare in the U.S. and the Impact on Detroit" Economic Club of Detroit. Retrieved 2019-01-04.

External links
Forbes
Wall Street Journal

Living people
American health care chief executives
American health care businesspeople
Businesspeople from California
Harvard Business School alumni
Harvard Business School faculty
People from La Jolla, San Diego
Stanford University alumni
Tenet Healthcare
Year of birth missing (living people)